John Leveson-Gower, 1st Earl Gower PC (10 August 1694 – 25 December 1754), was an English Tory politician and peer who twice served as Lord Privy Seal from 1742 to 1743 and 1744 to 1754. Leveson-Gower is best known for his political career in the British Parliament, where he sat in the House of Lords as a leading member of the Tory Party before defecting to serve in various Whig-dominated government ministries until his death.

Born in London, England into a prominent aristocratic family, Leveson-Gower was educated at Westminster School and the University of Oxford. After his father died in 1709, Leveson-Gower assumed his peerage as the Baron Gower and took his seat in the House of Lords. As part of his political career, he embarked on an effort to bring several parliamentary constituencies in Staffordshire and Westminster under his control during the 1720's. 

In 1742, Leveson-Gower started serving in the Carteret ministry as Lord Privy Seal. Though he resigned the next year, in 1744 Leveson-Gower again served in the same position as part of the Whig-led Broad Bottom ministry. He soon became a devoted supporter of Henry Pelham and his brother the Duke of Newcastle. During the Jacobite rising of 1745, he remained loyal to the Hanoverians, which led George II to grant him the title of Earl Gower.

During the 1747 British general election, seven parliamentary constituencies which were under Leveson-Gower's control were contested by rival Tory candidates. Despite spending large sums of money from his vast financial estate, he only managed to retain two constituencies, Stafford and Lichfield. Leveson-Gower subsequently refused calls to resign twice in 1751 and 1754, before dying in office on 25 December 1754 at his London townhouse.

Early life

John Leveson-Gower was born on 10 August 1694 in London, England into the aristocratic Leveson-Gower family. His father was John Leveson-Gower, a politician who sat in the House of Commons until he was elevated to the English peerage in 1703 as the Baron Gower; he also served as the Chancellor of the Duchy of Lancaster. Leveson-Gower's mother was Lady Catherine Manners, the eldest daughter of the 1st Duke of Rutland.

Leveson-Gower was educated at Westminster School before graduating from Christ Church, Oxford after entering the college in 1710. During his youth, though he was a Jacobite sympathiser, Leveson-Gower remained uninvolved in politics, being more interested in fox hunting and horse racing. However, beginning in 1720 he turned his attention to political affairs, making efforts to bring parliamentary seats in Staffordshire under his control.

By the late 1720's, Leveson-Gower had managed to secure a base of parliamentary support, which consisted of four constituencies: Newcastle-under-Lyme, Stafford, Lichfield and Cheadle (he served as the town mayor of Cheadle in 1721). After Leveson-Gower's father died in 1709, Leveson-Gower inherited his peerage and soon took his seat in the British House of Lords, eventually emerging as a leading figure in the Tory faction.

Political career

In 1740, Leveson-Gower was appointed as a Lord Justice; after the Tory-led Walpole ministry collapsed in 1742, he was appointed to the position of Lord Privy Seal, succeeding John Hervey, 2nd Baron Hervey and being the lone Tory politician to be promoted to such high office after the collapse. He was also appointed to the Privy Council of Great Britain on 12 May 1742 by the Carteret ministry, which was a Whig-dominated administration.

Leveson-Gower's alliance with a rival political party, described by historians as "a move of considerable party political importance", soon collapsed as he resigned from his position on December 1743. However, he was reappointed as Lord Privy Seal in 1744 as part of the Broad Bottom ministry, a coalition government led by Henry Pelham and his brother Thomas Pelham-Holles, 1st Duke of Newcastle, which stayed in power for a decade.

When the Jacobite rising of 1745 broke out, Leveson-Gower personally assured King George II of Great Britain of his loyalty, raising one of the fifteen new British military regiments formed to counter a possible Jacobite invasion; in recognition of these actions, he was granted the titles of Viscount Trentham and Earl Gower by George II on 8 July 1746. However, Leveson-Gower's regiment proved unwilling to face any possibility of fighting, refusing to march beyond the nearest inn when his son-in-law Sir Richard Wrottesley raised a new Yeomanry unit to join them.

In 1748, he was again appointed as a Lord Justice, being appointed again in 1750 and 1752. Leveson-Gower's continuing support of a Whig-led ministry led to increasing backlash amongst his fellow Tories and English Jacobites, who perceived John Russell, 4th Duke of Bedford as having "corrupted" him; in a letter to the 4th Duke of Bedford, Leveson-Gower complained that he was being "persecuted by the gout and Jacobitism". In 1747, a protest by a group of English Jacobites at the Lichfield horse races forced Leveson-Gower to refrain from leaving his house for a time.

Despite mounting levels of public and private criticism, he refused to resign from his position as Lord Privy Seal, an action which led English lexicographer and prominent Tory Dr. Samuel Johnson to include Leveson-Gower in his seminal 1755 work A Dictionary of the English Language under the definition of renegado, though this was later removed by Johnson's printer. By the early 1750's, Leveson-Gower had solidified his political loyalty to the Pelham brothers, joining a group of British politicians (dominated by members of the Whig party) known as the "Pelhamites".

Later life and death

During the 1747 British general election, Leveson-Gower's parliamentary support base, which included seven constituencies in Staffordshire and Westminster, came under heavy threat by rival political candidates. Though he had succeeded to the position of Lord Lieutenant of Staffordshire in 1742, which gave him a large advantage in determining the outcome of parliamentary elections, all seven constituencies were contested by Tory politicians with extensive backing.

Despite suffering from gout, Leveson-Gower chose to defend his support base, focusing on the constituencies of Stafford and Lichfield; this was despite the fact that, as George Anson noted in a letter to the 4th Duke of Bedford, "everything has been done that could be thought of against Lord Gower's interest". Leveson-Gower complained that he was being opposed in the elections "by... men that I have lived in the strictest friendship with the best part of my life".

When the results of the elections were announced, Leveson-Gower discovered that, despite his extensive campaigning efforts, he had lost five out of the seven constituencies of his support base; the two he had retained, Stafford and Lichfield, were due in Henry Pelham's opinion "almost entirely to the Whigs". According to Wisker, the "considerable" cost of campaigning during the general election sapped a significant portion of Leveson-Gower's financial estate.

In June 1751, Leveson-Gower refused to join his third son Granville (by now a member of parliament) and the 4th Duke of Bedford in resigning from their positions as a show of support to John Montagu, 4th Earl of Sandwich, who had been dismissed from his position as First Lord of the Admiralty by the 1st Duke of Newcastle. When Henry Pelham died in March 1754, leading to the Broad Bottom ministry's collapse, he again refused to resign from his position.

On 25 December 1754, he died at his London townhouse at 6 Upper Brook Street. After his death, Leveson-Gower's titles were inherited by Granville, while his position as Lord Privy Seal was succeeded by Charles Spencer, 3rd Duke of Marlborough. His death was recorded in a letter written by English writer, bluestocking and artist Mary Delany on December 28, who noted as per custom that women who mourned Leveson-Gower's passing wore only grey or white clothing for a week.

Personal life, family and legacy

After his father's death, Leveson-Gower inherited Trentham Estate from him. In 1730, he erected Trentham Hall, an English country house, on the property, basing it on the design of Buckingham House. When Granville inherited the estate at Trentham from Leveson-Gower, which included the country house, he substantially altered it based on designs supplied by architect Henry Holland from 1775 to 1778. It was further altered from 1833 to 1842 by George Sutherland-Leveson-Gower, 2nd Duke of Sutherland, who employed Sir Charles Barry to carry out the renovations.

Leveson-Gower's extensive political career was supported by his vast personal estate, which consisted in part of investments in Britain's industrial production sector and ownership of financial shares in eight other estates, including those of fellow noblemen Willem van Keppel, 2nd Earl of Albemarle and William Pulteney, 1st Earl of Bath. However, the high costs of electoral campaigning combined with family expenses took a heavy toll on his estate, and by Leveson-Gower's death in 1754, he owed outstanding debts to the tune of £37,861 along with roughly £36,000 in legacies.

Over the course of his life, Leveson-Gower married thrice. On 13 March 1712, he married Lady Evelyn Pierrepont, the daughter of Evelyn Pierrepont, 1st Duke of Kingston-upon-Hull. They had eleven children, including Granville and Gertrude, before she died on 26 June 1727. After her death, Leveson-Gower remarried to Penelope Stonhouse on 31 October 1733, though she soon died on 19 August 1734. Leveson-Gower's third and final wife was Lady Mary Tufton, whom he married on 16 May 1736. Mary had two sons with him, surviving his death and dying on 9 February 1785.

Granville, who chose to follow his father into a career in politics, also served as Lord Privy Seal, succeeding to the position in 1755 after the 3rd Duke of Marlborough and holding it until 1757. He would go on to be granted the title of Marquess of Stafford in 1786 by King George III and serve as a leading Tory politician. Meanwhile, Leveson-Gower's sixth son John enlisted in the Royal Navy and participated in several naval battles with France during the American War of Independence before entering Parliament and sitting in the House of Commons until his death in 1792.

References

Footnotes

Bibliography

 
 
 
 
 
 
 
 
 
 
 
 

1694 births
1754 deaths
18th-century English politicians
Earls in the Peerage of Great Britain
John Leveson-Gower, 1st Earl Gower
Lord-Lieutenants of Staffordshire
Lords Privy Seal
Members of the Privy Council of Great Britain
People educated at Adams' Grammar School